"Hopeless Love" is a single by Canadian country music group One Horse Blue. Released in 1995, it was the seventh single from their album One Horse Blue. The song reached #1 on the RPM Country Tracks chart in March 1995.

Chart performance

Year-end charts

References

1995 singles
One Horse Blue songs
1993 songs